The 1993 James Hardie 12 Hour was an endurance race for production cars staged at the Mount Panorama Circuit, Bathurst, New South Wales, Australia on 11 April 1993. The race, which was the  third James Hardie 12 Hour, was won by Alan Jones and Garry Waldon driving a Mazda RX-7 entered by Mazda Australia.

Class structure
The field was divided into six classes:

Class A
Class A : Touring Cars Under 1800cc - featured a battle between Toyota Corolla and smaller, lighter Suzuki Swift.

Class B
Class B : Touring Cars 1801- 2500cc - was made up of a variety of cars, Citroën BX, Hyundai Lantra, Mazda 323, Nissan Pintara and Nissan Pulsar

Class C
Class C : Touring Cars 2501-4000cc - a class intended for six cylinder Ford Falcon and Holden Commodore saw an influx of naturally aspirated sports cars, Honda NSX and Porsche 968 which were expected to be outright threats.

Class D
Class D : Touring Cars Over 4000cc - featured V8 powered Ford Falcon and Holden Commodore with the production car version of the Holden touring car expected to be fastest.

Class S
Class S : Sports Cars Under 2200cc - was dominated by Toyota MR2 but also contained Honda CRX and Nissan NX.

Class T
Class T : Turbo and 4WD Cars - mixed class featuring small turbos, Ford Laser, Hyundai Scoupe and Mitsubishi Lancer but also larger Mitsubishi Galant and Subaru Liberty but was largely dominated by larger sports cars, Lotus Esprit, Nissan Skyline GT-R, Toyota Supra and in particular the factory supported team of Mazda RX-7s.

Results 
Results of the event are given below.

Statistics
 Attendance: 14,000 
 Pole Position - #18 Larry Perkins - 2:32.89
 Fastest Lap - #18 Larry Perkins - 2:31.77 (147.37 km/h)
 Race time of winning car: 12h 00m 24.58s 
 Distance covered by winning car: 263 laps, 1634.02 km 
 Winners' Average Speed - 136.09 km/h

References

Motorsport in Bathurst, New South Wales
James Hardie 12 Hour